Lionel Gouly (12 February 1873 – 15 April 1911) was an Australian cricketer. He played four first-class matches for Western Australia between 1905/06 and 1907/08.

See also
 List of Western Australia first-class cricketers

References

External links
 

1873 births
1911 deaths
Australian cricketers
Western Australia cricketers
Cricketers from Sydney